Stavriana Antoniou (born 12 November 2000) is a Cypriot footballer who plays as a forward for First Division club Chrysomilia Agios Ambrosios Kyrenia and the Cyprus women's national team.

Career
Antoniou has been capped for the Cyprus national team, appearing for the team during the UEFA Women's Euro 2021 qualifying cycle.

References

External links
 
 

2000 births
Living people
Women's association football forwards
Cypriot women's footballers
Cyprus women's international footballers
Apollon Ladies F.C. players